Fürstenberg (Havel) station is a railway station in the municipality of Fürstenberg/Havel, located in the Oberhavel district in Brandenburg, Germany.

Sold station building
The station building shown on the picture has been sold to a private individual. It now hosts:
 Rental space for e.g. workshops in the former waiting hall
 A woodworking shop
 The Verstehbahnhof makerspace:
This makerspace is primarily directed towards school groups. It also has:
3D-printers
Lasercutters
One of the two Jugend hackt (youth hacking organization) headquarters

References

Railway stations in Brandenburg
Buildings and structures in Oberhavel
Hackerspaces